What America Thinks is a syndicated American television show. It was hosted by opinion pollster and political commentator Scott Rasmussen from 2012 to 2013, and is currently hosted by Alex Boyer. WCBS-TV is the anchor station. The program, which is syndicated on over 120 stations, is produced by Telco Productions and Rasmussen Reports.

Format
The program features discussions of current events and public opinion with a guest panel. Guests have included Scott Walker, Howard Dean, and Rand Paul. An episode of the show, titled What New Hampshire Thinks, won a 2012 Granite Mike Award from the New Hampshire Association of Broadcasters. In June 2013, 60 additional stations signed up to air the show beginning on July 21, 2013, bringing the total number of stations airing the show to over 120.

Episodes
The following is a list of the show's episodes:

References

External links
 What America Thinks website

2012 American television series debuts
American television talk shows